Cape Burney is a coastal town and locality  south of Geraldton, Western Australia at the mouth of the Greenough River. Its local government area is the City of Greater Geraldton. At the 2016 census, Cape Burney had a population of 500.

The locality was gazetted in 1985.

Cape Burney contains a caravan park, popular with surfers and recreational fishermen, as well as the Southgate Dunes to the north of the settlement which separate the settlement from Geraldton.

References

Coastal towns in Western Australia